Raymond Kopa (né Kopaszewski; 13 October 1931 – 3 March 2017) was a French professional footballer, integral to the France national team of the 1950s. At club level he was part of the legendary Real Madrid team of the 1950s, winning three European Cups.

Often considered one of the best players of his generation, Kopa was an attacking midfielder who was quick, agile and known for his dribbling, playmaking, and prolific scoring. In 1958, Kopa was awarded the Ballon d'Or. In 1970, he became the first football player to receive the Légion d'honneur, and in 2004, Pelé named him one of the 125 Greatest Living Footballers at a FIFA Awards Ceremony.

Early and personal life
Kopa was born to a family of Polish immigrants. His grandparents were originally from Kraków and migrated to Germany, where his parents were born. They then migrated to France after the First World War. His surname was shortened to Kopa from Kopaszewski while he was at school. At the age of 14, he followed in the footsteps of his grandfather, father and brother by working in the coal mines of Nœux-les-Mines. During this time Kopa lost a finger in a mining accident.

Kopa married Christiane, the sister of a teammate of his at Angers. After retiring from the game he launched his own sportswear brand, eventually settling in Corsica. Kopa died in Angers on 3 March 2017, aged 85.

Kopa was mentored by Paul Sinibaldi. Sinibaldi was the godfather to Kopa's son.

Career

After finishing second in the French national youth football trials in 1949, Kopa began his professional career at age 17 with Angers in Ligue 2 and was transferred two years later to Reims, with whom he won French championships in 1953 and 1955. He won the 1953 Latin Cup with Reims, where they defeated Milan 3–0 in the final, and helped them reach the 1956 European Cup Final, which the team lost to Alfredo Di Stéfano's Real Madrid, 4–3.

Kopa had first attracted attention in Spain when he played for France against Spain in a match in Madrid in March 1955, after which the Spanish sports newspaper Marca nicknaming him "Little Napoleon". Kopa was transferred to Real Madrid for the 1956–57 season, where he was soon joined by Ferenc Puskás. Despite playing as an inside right at Real Madrid rather than as the no. 10, his usual position, Kopa helped the club to three successive European cup victories and the Spanish league title in 1957 and 1958. Kopa was also the first French player to win the European Cup when Madrid defeated Fiorentina 2–0 in the 1957 final. He would go on to be European champion again in 1958 and 1959, the latter against former side Reims, where Just Fontaine was playing. In the 1959–60 season, Kopa returned to France to finish his career with Reims, where he won further Championnats in 1960 and 1962. In total, he scored 75 goals in 346 matches in France's top flight, and was awarded the Ballon d'or by France Football in 1958.

With the France national team, Kopa scored 18 goals in 45 matches between 1952 and 1962. He played in the 1958 FIFA World Cup in Sweden, where he performed outstandingly and was one of the players of the tournament, scoring three goals as he led France to the semi-finals, where they succumbed to a strong Brazil team. The French team finished third in the tournament.

In March 2004, Kopa was named by Pelé as one of the top 125 greatest living footballers. In 2018, France Football's Kopa Trophy, awarded to the best young football player in the calendar year was named in Raymond's honor. The first recipient was fellow Frenchman Kylian Mbappé.

Career statistics

Club

International

Scores and results list France's goal tally first, score column indicates score after each Kopa goal.

Honours
Reims
Division 1: 1952–53, 1954–55, 1959–60, 1961–62
Latin Cup: 1953
Division 2: 1965–66

Real Madrid
La Liga: 1956–57, 1957–58
European Cup: 1956–57, 1957–58, 1958–59
Latin Cup: 1957

France
FIFA World Cup third place: 1958

Individual
Ballon d'or: 1958; runner-up: 1959; third place: 1956, 1957
FIFA World Cup All-Star Team: 1958
Etoile d'Or: 1960
French Player of the Year: 1960
FIFA XI: 1963
World Soccer World XI: 1963
World Soccer: The 100 Greatest Footballers of All Time
Golden Foot: 2006, as a football legend
UEFA President's Award: 2010
FIFA 100
3rd French Player of the Century

Orders
Chevalier of the Légion d'honneur: 1970
Officier of the Légion d'honneur: 2007

Notes

References

External links

 
 

FootballDatabase profile and stats 
European Champions Cup/UEFA Champions League Winning Squads
Interview on uefa.com

1931 births
2017 deaths
French people of Polish descent
French footballers
Association football midfielders
Angers SCO players
Stade de Reims players
Real Madrid CF players
Ligue 1 players
Ligue 2 players
La Liga players
UEFA Champions League winning players
Ballon d'Or winners
FIFA 100
France international footballers
1954 FIFA World Cup players
1958 FIFA World Cup players
French expatriate footballers
French expatriate sportspeople in Spain
Expatriate footballers in Spain
Chevaliers of the Légion d'honneur
Officiers of the Légion d'honneur
Sportspeople from Pas-de-Calais
US Nœux-les-Mines players
Footballers from Hauts-de-France